Erik Paul Schullstrom (born March 25, 1969) is a former professional baseball pitcher who played for the Minnesota Twins in its 1994 and 1995 seasons. He was born in San Diego, California and attended Alameda High School where he was voted Oakland Tribune Northern California Pitcher of the year in 1987. He later attended Fresno State University where he was a Freshman All-American in 1988 after going 14-2 with 11 complete games. The Bulldogs were at one point ranked #1 in the nation after winning 32 consecutive games, and eventually finished 7th in the 1988 College World Series. He also was a member of Team USA in 1989.

Career
Schullstrom was originally drafted out of high school by the Toronto Blue Jays 620th overall in the 24th round of the 1987 Major League Baseball draft. Deciding not to sign, he would have to wait until 1990 to be drafted again, where he was selected 51st overall in the 2nd round of the 1990 draft by the Baltimore Orioles.

In the minors, Schullstrom spent time starting and relieving. Perhaps his best minor league season as a starter was in 1991, where he went 5–6 with a 3.05 ERA and 93 K's in 85+ innings. His best season as a reliever in the minors was 1994 with Nashville, when he had a 2.63 ERA in 26 games, and 43 strikeouts in 41 innings.

Schullstrom was traded twice by the Orioles within a span of a year. He was first dealt to the Padres for Craig Lefferts on August 31, 1992 in a deal which was completed four days later on September 4 when Ricky Gutiérrez joined him in San Diego. He was claimed off waivers on April 2, 1993 by the Orioles who sent him to the Twins 4 months later on August 16 to complete a transaction from the previous day in which Mike Pagliarulo went to Baltimore.

On July 18, 1994, Schullstrom made his Major League debut as a 25-year-old rookie for the Twins. In nine games that year, he posted an ERA of 2.77 and had 13 strikeouts in 13 innings of work. His success did not carry over to the next season-in 37 games in 1995, he had a 6.89 ERA.

In the field, he committed only one error in his career for a .889 fielding percentage.

On September 27, 1995, Schullstrom played his final Major League game. Even though this was the end to his majors career, he played four seasons in Japan, two for the Nippon-Ham Fighters in 1998 and 1999, and two for the Hiroshima Toyo Carp in 2001 and 2002.

Schullstrom is currently the Director of Scouting-USA for the Hiroshima Toyo Carp of the Nippon Professional Baseball League.

Other information
Earned $109,000 in 1994 and $113,000 in 1995.
Wore the number 58 in both his stints with the Twins.
Holds the Major League record of 60 innings pitched without being awarded a decision, i.e. a win or a loss.

On July 3, 1991, starting for the Frederick Keys at Class A+ Carolina League, pitched a 2–0 no-hitter against the Kinston Indians.

In between, played winter ball with the Tiburones de La Guaira club of the Venezuelan League, and also for the Acereros de Monclova and Sultanes de Monterrey of the Mexican League.

Schullstrom resides in Alameda, California.

External links
, or Retrosheet, or Pura Pelota (Venezuelan Winter League)

References

1969 births
Living people
Acereros de Monclova players
American expatriate baseball players in Japan
American expatriate baseball players in Mexico
Baseball players from San Diego
Bowie Baysox players
California State University, Fresno alumni
Frederick Keys players
Fresno State Bulldogs baseball players
Hagerstown Suns players
Hiroshima Toyo Carp players
Las Vegas Stars (baseball) players
Major League Baseball pitchers
Mexican League baseball pitchers
Minnesota Twins players
Nashville Xpress players
Nippon Ham Fighters players
Nippon Professional Baseball pitchers
Pawtucket Red Sox players
Salt Lake Buzz players
Sultanes de Monterrey players
Tiburones de La Guaira players
American expatriate baseball players in Venezuela
Trenton Thunder players
Wausau Timbers players
Alaska Goldpanners of Fairbanks players